Philipp Ferdinand de Hamilton (c. 1664 – 1750), was an 18th-century painter from the Southern Netherlands active in Austria.

Biography
He was born in Brussels as the son of the Scottish painter James de Hamilton, who taught him to paint. From 1705 to 1750 he was court painter in Vienna, and he is known for hunting scenes like his brother Johann Georg.
He died in Vienna.

References

Philipp Ferdinand de Hamilton on Artnet

1664 births
1750 deaths
Painters from the Austrian Netherlands
Artists from Brussels
Court painters